Hasty is an unincorporated town, a post office, and a census-designated place (CDP) located in and governed by Bent County, Colorado, United States. The Hasty post office has the ZIP code 81044. At the United States Census 2010, the population of the Hasty CDP was 144, while the population of the 81044 ZIP Code Tabulation Area was 224 including adjacent areas.

History
The Hasty post office has been in operation since 1910. The community was named after Lon Hasty, a pioneer settler.

Geography
Hasty is located in northeast Bent County at  (38.112410,-102.957344), just north of the dam for John Martin Reservoir on the Arkansas River. U.S. Highway 50 passes through the community, leading west  to Las Animas, the county seat, and east  to Lamar.

Demographics

See also

Outline of Colorado
Index of Colorado-related articles
State of Colorado
Colorado cities and towns
Colorado census designated places
Colorado counties
Bent County, Colorado

References

External links

Hasty @ Colorado.com
Hasty @ UncoverColorado.com
Bent County website

Census-designated places in Bent County, Colorado
Census-designated places in Colorado